Narsinghpur Assembly constituency is one of the 230 Vidhan Sabha (Legislative Assembly) constituencies of Madhya Pradesh state in central India.

It is part of Narsinghpur District.

See also
 Narsinghpur

References

Assembly constituencies of Madhya Pradesh